U Bein Bridge is a crossing that spans the Taungthaman Lake near Amarapura in Myanmar. The  bridge was built around 1850 and is believed to be the oldest and longest teakwood bridge in the world. Construction began when the capital of Ava Kingdom moved to Amarapura, and the bridge is named after Maung Bein who had it built. It is used as an important passageway for the local people and has also become a tourist attraction and therefore a significant source of income for souvenir sellers. It is particularly busy during July and August when the lake is at its highest.

The bridge was built from wood reclaimed from the former royal palace in Inwa. It features 1,086 pillars that stretch out of the water, some of which have been replaced with concrete. Though the bridge largely remains intact, there are fears that an increasing number of the pillars are becoming dangerously decayed. Some have become entirely detached from their bases and only remain in place because of the lateral bars holding them together. Damage to these supports have been caused by flooding as well as a fish breeding program introduced into the lake which has caused the water to become stagnant. The Ministry of Culture’s Department of Archaeology, National Museum and Library plans to carry out repairs when plans for the work are finalised.

From 1 April 2009, eight police force personnel have been deployed to guard the bridge. Their presence is aimed at reducing anti-social behaviour and preventing criminal activities, with the first arrest coming in September 2013 when two men were reported for harassing tourists.

Construction 
The construction was started in 1849 and finished in 1851. Myanmar construction engineers used traditional methods of scaling and measuring to build the bridge. According to historic books about U Bein Bridge, Myanmar engineers made scale by counting the footsteps.

Design and Structure 
The bridge was built in curved shape in the middle to resist the assault of wind and water. The main teak posts were hammered into the lake bed seven feet deep. The other ends of the posts were shaped conically to make sure that rain water would fall down easily. The joints of the bridge are intertwined.

Originally, there were 984 teak posts supporting the bridge and two approach brick bridges. Later the two approach brick bridges were replaced by wooden approach bridge. There are four wooden pavilions at the same interval along the bridge. By adding posts of two approach bridges and four pavilions, the number of posts amounts to 1089.

There are nine passageways in the bridge, where the floors can be lifted to let boats and barges pass. There 482 spans and the length of the bridge is 1,209 metres.

Gallery

References

Amarapura
Bridges in Myanmar
Wooden bridges
Buildings and structures in Mandalay Region
Wooden buildings and structures in Myanmar